Catherine Charlotte de Gramont (1639 – 4 June 1678) was the Princess of Monaco by marriage to Louis I of Monaco. She is known to have been a mistress of Louis XIV of France in 1666.

Life

Early life

Catherine Charlotte de Gramont was the eldest daughter of Marshal, Duke Antoine de Gramont and Françoise Marguerite du Plessis de Chivré (1608–1689), a niece of Cardinal Richelieu. Catherine Charlotte's elder brother was Guy Armand de Gramont, the celebrated Count of Guiche, known for his arrogance and good looks, who was successively the lover of Philippe of France, Duke of Orléans and Princess Henrietta of England, husband and wife.

Catherine Charlotte was educated in a fashionable convent school, the Visitation Faubourg Saint Jacques in Paris, where many daughters of the aristocracy were educated. She was described as a sophisticated, vivacious, strong-willed beauty. She fell mutually in love with her cousin, Antonin Nompar, marquis de Puyguilleim, and when her father refused his permission for them to marry, they became lovers all the same.

Duchess of Valentinois

In March 1660 at the Chateau de Gramont, Catherine married Louis de Grimaldi, the second Duke of Valentinois and heir to the throne of Monaco, who was described as "a glorious and avaricious Italian". They had six children.

The marriage was arranged to strengthen the alliance between Monaco and France against Spain by forging a connection between the Princely House of Monaco and a member of the French high nobility, which could provide valuable connections to the French court. Catherine Charlotte's family connections fit this description, Louis was impressed by her beauty, and the French monarch gave his consent. Catherine Charlotte herself was convinced because her lover refused to elope with her, she was older than most noblewomen when they married, and that her marriage would give her a high rank at the French royal court, which she would not have to leave, at least not until her husband became Prince of Monaco. After marriage, the couple resided in Paris and regularly attended the French court, and Catherine Charlotte continued her relationship with her cousin.

Princess of Monaco

In 1662, she became Princess of Monaco when her husband succeeded to the throne. Catherine Charlotte was forced to accompany him to Monaco against her will, but Puyguilleim accompanied her on the way in disguise. She remained in Monaco for three years. She did not like her stay in Monaco, where the Princely court did not consist of much more than the Grimaldi relatives and hardly any court life or high society life existed at the time.

In 1665, the Prince and Princess of Monaco returned to the French royal court, where Catherine Charlotte was appointed lady-in-waiting to Princess Henrietta of England, sister-in-law and former lover of Louis XIV, with whom she was rumoured to have a bisexual love affair. Her aunt, Suzanne Charlotte de Gramont, marquise de Saint Chaumont, was also a member of Henrietta's household as the governess of her two daughters, Marie Louise and Anne Marie. She continued her love affair with Puyguilleim, but also became involved in a love affair with the Duke de Guiche. She was renowned for her beauty and wits, and attracted many lovers, including the king, the marquis de Villeroi, and her cousin, "the little Lauzun". Madame de Sévigné described her as "greedy for pleasure", and she was nicknamed Catherine the Torrent.   

Henrietta encouraged Catherine Charlotte to have an affair with the king to attract him away from his mistress, Louise de la Vallière, back to Henrietta. The king's affair with 
Catherine Charlotte in danger of being exposed to a public scandal because of Catherine Charlotte's other lovers, de Guiche and Puyguilleim: after a scene at court, there was a fear that the rivalry between the three men (as well as her husband) would result in a duel. After the scene, Catherine Charlotte's husband and her lover Duke de Guiche left the court to serve in the war. In the end, the king did leave Louise de la Vallière, but after his affair with Catherine Charlotte, he did not return to Henrietta, but begun an affair with Madame de Montespan instead.

In 1668, Catherine Charlotte had a love affair with Philippe, Chevalier de Lorraine, lover of the king's brother and Henrietta's husband Philippe I, Duke of Orléans. Henrietta regarded Lorraine to be her mortal enemy and was deeply offended by the affair, and successfully asked the king to exile Catherine Charlotte from court. At the same time, Catherine Charlotte's long-time lover Puyguilleim married. She returned to Monaco, where she lived a quiet life and remained for four years.

In 1672, Catherine Charlotte was able to return to Paris when she was offered a position as lady-in-waiting to the king's mistress, Madame de Montespan. Her employment ended the following year, but she was given her own house in Paris, where she was able to stay. During the following years, however, she fell ill with a progressive cancer.

Catherine Charlotte died in Paris on 4 June 1678, aged 39.

Issue

Antoine Grimaldi (25 January 1661 – 20 January 1731) Prince of Monaco, married Marie of Lorraine.
Maria Teresa Carlotta Grimaldi (14 January 1662 – 1738), died unmarried.
Giovanna Maria Devota Grimaldi (14 January 1662 – 21 April 1741), twin of Maria Teresa, a nun in San Remo.
Teresa Maria Aurelia Grimaldi (20 May 1663 – 15 February 1675), Mademoiselle des Baux.
Anna Ippòlita Grimaldi (26 July 1664 – 23 July 1700), married Jacques de Crussol (1675–1739) Duke of Uzès.
Francesco Onorato Grimaldi (31 December 1669 – 18 February 1748), Archbishop of Besançon.
Amelia Grimaldi (ca. 1675 – died young).

Ancestors

References 

 Le grand dictionaire historique ou le melange curieux

1639 births
1678 deaths
French princesses
House of Grimaldi
Mistresses of Louis XIV
Princesses of Monaco
Hereditary Princesses of Monaco